Philocoprella is a genus of flies belonging to the family Lesser Dung flies.

Species
P. arvernica (Richards, 1929)
P. italica (Deeming, 1964)
P. mongolica Papp, 1973
P. quadrispina (Laurence, 1952)
P. rectiradiata Papp, 1973

References

Further reading
 Laurence, B. R. 1952. Two coprophilous Diptera (Borboridae and Sepsidae) new to Britain. The Entomologist's Monthly Magazine 88: 81-82

Sphaeroceridae
Diptera of Asia
Diptera of Europe
Brachycera genera